Grønland (and variants) may refer to:

People
Laurits Grønland (1887–1957), Norwegian politician
Peter Grønland (1761–1825), Danish composer

Places
Grønland, the Danish name for Greenland
Grønland, Oslo, a neighbourhood in Oslo, Norway
Grønland (station), a rapid transit station on the Oslo Metro
Grønland, Agder, a village in Tvedestrand municipality in Agder county, Norway
Groenland mountains, a small range of mountains in Western Cape, South Africa

Other
HDMS Grønland, Ship-of-the-line, Danish-Norwegian navy (1756)
Grönland Records, a record label